North America is the third largest continent, and is also a portion of the third largest supercontinent if North and South America are combined into the Americas and Africa, Europe, and Asia are considered to be part of one supercontinent called Afro-Eurasia. With an estimated population of 580 million and an area of 24,709,000 km2 (9,540,000 mi2), the northernmost of the two continents of the Western Hemisphere is bounded by the Pacific Ocean on the west; the Atlantic Ocean on the east; the Caribbean Sea on the south; and the Arctic Ocean on the north.

The northern half of North America is sparsely populated and covered mostly by Canada, except for the northeastern portion, which is occupied by Greenland, and the northwestern portion, which is occupied by Alaska, the largest state of the United States. The central and southern portions of the continent are occupied by the contiguous United States, Mexico, and numerous smaller states in Central America and in the Caribbean.

The continent is delimited on the southeast by most geographers at the Darién watershed along the Colombia-Panama border, placing all of Panama within North America.  Alternatively, a less common view would end North America at the man-made Panama Canal.  Islands generally associated with North America include Greenland, the world's largest island, and archipelagos and islands in the Caribbean. The terminology of the Americas is complex, but  "Anglo-America" can describe Canada and the U.S., while "Latin America" comprises Mexico and the countries of Central America and the Caribbean, as well as the entire continent of South America.

Natural features of North America include the northern portion of the American Cordillera, represented by the geologically new Rocky Mountains in the west; and the considerably older Appalachian Mountains to the east. The north hosts an abundance of glacial lakes formed during the last glacial period, including the Great Lakes. North America's major continental divide is the Great Divide, which runs north and south down through Rocky Mountains. The major watersheds draining to the include the Mississippi/Missouri and Rio Grande draining into the Gulf of Mexico (part of the Atlantic Ocean), and the St. Lawrence draining into the Atlantic. The Colorado, Colombia, and Yukon Rivers drain west to the Pacific Ocean. 

Climate is determined to a large extent by the latitude, ranging from Arctic cold in the north to tropical heat in the south. There are steppes (known as "prairies") in the central and western portions, and deserts in the Southwestern United States of Arizona, Colorado, California, Nevada, New Mexico, Utah, and Texas; along with the Mexican states of Baja California, Baja California Sur, Sonora, Chihuahua, Coahuila, Nuevo Leon and Tamaulipas.

Paleogeography

Seventy percent of North America is underlain by the Laurentia craton, which is exposed as the Canadian Shield in much of central and eastern Canada around the Hudson Bay, and as far south as the U.S. states of Michigan, Wisconsin, and Minnesota. The continental crust started to form 4 billion years ago (Ga), and six of the microcontinents collided to form the craton about 2 Ga. This core has been enlarged by plate tectonics, most notably between 1.8 and 1.65 Ga when a piece currently stretching from Arizona to Missouri fused with the south and west portion of the craton. The craton started to rift about 1.1 Ga, and the fissure (now the Midcontinent Rift System) ran between Kansas and Lake Superior before stopping, perhaps due to the Grenville collision in the east. Otherwise the craton has remained relatively stable, with some rocks dating from 2.5 to 4 Ga, including what may be the world's oldest known rock: Specimens from the Nuvvuagittuq greenstone belt on the coast of the Hudson Bay have been dated to 4.38 Ga, though the dating methods are disputed. Periodic flooding by inland seas, most recently the Western Interior Seaway during the Cretaceous, caused the layer of sedimentary rock over the remainder of the craton. The Laurentia craton is the center of the Proterozoic supercontinent Rodinia in most models, and was also part of the later Laurussia, Pangea, and Laurasia supercontinents.

Roughly 3 million years ago (Ma), the volcanic Isthmus of Panama formed between the North and South American continents creating a bridge over what was the Central American Seaway and allowing the migration of flora and fauna between the two landmasses in the Great American Interchange. Starting 2.58 Ma, the Quaternary glaciation covered much of the continent with ice, centered west of Hudson Bay, the floor of which is slowly rebounding after being depressed by the great weight of the ice. Glaciers descended the slopes of the Rocky Mountains and those of the Pacific Margin. Extensive glacial lakes, such as Glacial Lake Missoula, Bonneville, Lahontan, Agassiz, and Algonquin, formed by glacial melt water. "Remnants of them are still visible in the Great Basin and along the edge of the Canadian Shield in the form of the Great Salt Lake, the Great Lakes, and the large lakes of west central Canada." The last glacial period of the current ice age caused a lowering of the sea level, exposing the Bering Land Bridge between Alaska and Siberia, which resulted in human migration from Asia to the Americas between 40,000 and 15,000 years ago.

Physiography
North America may be divided into at least five major physiographic regions:
Canadian Shield This is a geologically stable area of rock dating between 2.5 and 4 Gya that occupies most of the northeastern quadrant, including Greenland.

Appalachian Mountains The Appalachians are an old and eroded system that formed about 300 Ma and extends from the Gaspé Peninsula to Alabama.

Atlantic Coastal Plain The plain is a belt of lowlands widening to the south that extends from south New England to Mexico.

Interior Lowlands The lowlands extend down the middle of the continent from the Mackenzie Valley to the Atlantic Coastal Plain, and include the Great Plains on the west and the agriculturally productive Interior Plains on the east.

North American Cordillera The cordillera is a complex belt of mountains and associated plateaus and basins some of which were formed as recently as 100–65 Ma, during the Cretaceous. The cordillera extend from Alaska into Mexico and includes two orogenic belts — the Pacific Margin on the west and the Rocky Mountains on the east — separated by a system of intermontane plateaus and basins.

The Coastal Plain and the main belts of the North American Cordillera continue in the south in Mexico (where the Mexican Plateau, bordered by the Sierra Madre Oriental and the Sierra Madre Occidental, is considered a continuation of the intermontane system) to connect the Transverse Volcanic Range, a zone of high and active volcanic peaks south of Mexico City.

The vast majority of North America is located on the North American Plate, centered on the Laurentia craton. Parts of California and western Mexico form the partial edge of the Pacific Plate; the two plates meet along the San Andreas Fault. The southern portion of the Caribbean and parts of Central America compose the much smaller Caribbean Plate.

The western mountains have split in the middle, into the main range of the Rockies and the Coast Ranges in California, Oregon, Washington, and British Columbia with the Great Basin (a lower area containing smaller ranges and low-lying deserts) in between. The highest peak is Mount McKinley/Denali in Alaska.

Three countries (Canada, the United States, and Mexico) make up most of North America's land mass; they share the continent with 34 other island countries in the Caribbean and south of Mexico.

Geographic center of North America
The geographic center of North America is near Center, North Dakota, according to Peter Rogerson, geography professor at the University at Buffalo, who published a new method of calculating geographical centers.

Earlier placements in 1931 involved geographers balancing a cardboard cutout of a region on a needlelike point to find its center to establish a spot "6 miles west of Balta, Pierce County, North Dakota", at 48⁰ 10′north, 100⁰ 10′west. In 1932, a field stone cairn recognizing this was erected in nearby Rugby, North Dakota at the intersections of U.S. Route 2 and ND State Highway 3.

Surface and climate

The Great Plains is the broad expanse of prairie and steppe which lies east of the Rocky Mountains in the United States and Canada. The narrow plains in the Mexican coast and the savannas of the Mississippi are analogous to, respectively, the Patagonian Steppes and the pampas of the Piranha, Paraguay, and Rio de la Plata. Thus the Appalachians and the mountain chains of Brazil are regarded as creating similar interruptions to the plains community.

North America extends to within 10° of latitude of both the equator and the North Pole. It embraces every climatic zone, from tropical rain forest and savanna on the lowlands of Central America to areas of permanent ice cap in central Greenland. Subarctic and tundra climates prevail in north Canada and north Alaska, and desert and semiarid conditions are found in interior regions cut off by high mountains from rain-bearing westerly winds. However, most of the continent has temperate climates very favorable to settlement and agriculture. Prairies, or vast grasslands cover a huge amount in mountain ranges.

North America's greatest snowfalls

Hydrography and deserts

The average rainfall in North America is 76 cm/year, which produces some 18 petaliters of water.

River systems

Listed below by watershed are some of the more notable rivers in North America.  Rivers flow entirely within the United States, unless otherwise noted.
Atlantic Ocean watershed
Churchill River (Atlantic)  (in Canada)
Churchill River (Hudson Bay) , flows to Hudson Bay and then connects to Labrador Sea and Atlantic Ocean (in Canada)
Connecticut River 
Delaware 
Hudson River 
James River (Virginia) 
Potomac River 
Savannah River 
Susquehanna River 
St. Johns River 
St. Lawrence River 
Atlantic Ocean through the Caribbean Sea
Artibonite River  (in Haiti and Dominican Republic)
Cauto River  (in Cuba)
Atlantic Ocean through the Gulf of Mexico watershed
Allegheny River 
Arkansas River 
Brazos River 
Grijalva River  (in Mexico)
Mississippi 
Missouri River 
Ohio River 
Pecos River 
Red River of the South 
Tennessee River 
Rio Grande  (in Mexico and U.S.)
Usumacinta River  (in Guatemala and Mexico)
Arctic Ocean watershed
Albany River (in Canada) 
Mackenzie River  longest river in Canada, (flows through the Beaufort Sea in Canada)
Nelson River  (in Canada)
Severn River (northern Ontario)  (in Canada)
Saint John River (New Brunswick) (in Canada)
Pacific Ocean watershed
Balsas River (in Mexico)
Columbia River 
Fraser River (in Canada)
Lerma River (in Mexico)
Sacramento River
San Joaquin River
Snake River 
Suchiate River (in Guatemala and Mexico)
Yukon River (in Canada and U.S.)
Pacific Ocean through the Bering Sea
Kuskokwim River 

Pacific Ocean through the Gulf of California
Colorado River  (Mexico and U.S.)
Fuerte River (in Mexico)
Great Basin watershed (does not reach oceans)
Bear River 
Humboldt River 
Sevier River

Climate and vegetation 
There are various plant life distributions in North America. Plant life in the Arctic includes grasses, mosses, and Arctic willows. Coniferous trees, including spruces, pines, hemlocks, and firs, are indigenous to the Canadian and Western U.S. mountain ranges as far south as San Francisco. Among these are giant sequoias, redwoods, great firs, and sugar pines. Sugar pines are generally confined to the northwestern area of the United States.
The central region of the country has hardwoods. Southern states grow extensive yellow pines. In addition, mahogany, logwood, and lignumvitae - all tropical in nature - are grown. The southwest has desert plants, including yucca and cacti. The cultivated native plants of North America are tobacco, maize, vanilla, melons, cacao, gourds, indigo plant, and beans.

Deserts 
The Sierra Nevada and Cascade mountain ranges run along the entire Pacific Coast, acting as a barrier to the humid winds that sweep in from the ocean. As a result, the air has lost much of its moisture and becomes hot and dry when it reaches the areas east of the coastal mountain ranges. These arid conditions are, in some instances, exacerbated in regions of extremely low altitude (some near or below sea level) by higher air pressure, resulting in drier conditions and adiabatic heating effects, some of these pocket deserts exist in valleys well north of the Canada–US border in interior British Columbia. What precipitation does fall generally does not last long, lost primarily to evaporation, as well as rapid runoff and efficient water uptake and storage by native vegetation.

Zoology
North America is home to many native mammal species.  Several species of deer, including elk, caribou, moose, mule deer, and the abundant white-tailed deer are found throughout various regions, along with the bison in the central plains and the and musk ox in the Arctic tundra. Three species of bear, several subspecies of wolf, and various other carnivores such as raccoons, skunks, and cats including cougars and lynxes are widely distributed.  The family Mustelidae is well represented, including badgers, otters, ferrets, and wolverines.  Numerous species of squirrels and other rodents, such as beavers and muskrats, can be found in virtually every region of the continent. Central America has adapted sloths, anteaters, and armadillos. Other animals includes the California condor, mostly found in California, the parrots and the monkeys of Tropical forests, the humming bird, rattlesnake, alligator, and Cayman of the banks of the streams, and swarms of mosquitoes on the wide plains.

Mining and petroleum

The mining and petroleum industries are important in Canada, the United States and Mexico. These natural resources make the region one of the richest on the earth.

Rocky Mountains
The Rocky Mountain region is known for vast resources and rich mineral deposits including copper, lead, gold, silver, tungsten or Wolfram, uranium, zinc and Coal, petroleum and natural gas are mineral fuels found. Old mine tailings are present in the Rocky Mountain landscape.

Agriculture and forestry
Agriculture and forestry are two major industries. Agriculture includes arid land and irrigated farming and livestock grazing.  Livestock are often moved between high-elevation summer pastures and low-elevation and winter pastures.

See also

Geography of Canada
Geography of the Caribbean
Geography of Anguilla
Geography of Antigua and Barbuda
Geography of Aruba
Geography of Barbados
Geography of Bonaire
Geography of the British Virgin Islands
Geography of the Cayman Islands
Geography of Cuba
Geography of Curaçao
Geography of Dominica
Geography of the Dominican Republic
Geography of Grenada
Geography of Guadeloupe
Geography of Haiti
Geography of Jamaica
Geography of Martinique
Geography of Montserrat
Geography of Puerto Rico
Geography of Saba
Geography of Saint Barthélemy
Geography of Saint Kitts and Nevis
Geography of Saint Lucia
Geography of Saint Martin
Geography of Saint Vincent and the Grenadines
Geography of Sint Eustatius
Geography of Sint Maarten
Geography of Trinidad and Tobago
Geography of the United States Virgin Islands
Geography of Central America
Geography of Belize
Geography of Costa Rica
Geography of El Salvador
Geography of Guatemala
Geography of Honduras
Geography of Nicaragua
Geography of Panama
Geography of Greenland
Geography of the Lucayan Archipelago
Geography of the Bahamas
Geography of the Turks and Caicos Islands
Geography of Mexico
Geography of the United States
Geology of North America
List of mountain peaks of North America
List of rivers of the Americas by coastline
Transportation in North America

Notes

References

Bibliography
Map and aerial photos
 North America map
 Physical map
 Map of the Great Lakes 
 North American map
 North America Political map
 Oldest Human Remains in North America Found
 T. H. Clark and C. W. Stearn, The Geological Evolution of North America (1968)
 W. P. Cumming et al., The Discovery of North America (1972)
 R. C. West et al., Middle America: Its Lands and Peoples (3d ed. 1989)
 T. L. McKnight, Regional Geography of the United States and Canada (1992)
 S. Birdsall, Regional Landscapes of the United States and Canada (4th rev. ed. 1992)
 T. Flannery, The Eternal Frontier: An Ecological History of North America and Its Peoples (2001)
 A. Taylor, American Colonies (2001).

External links 
 The Future for Water in North America

 
Water in North America